Oko-Akarè is an arrondissement in the Plateau department of Benin. It is an administrative division under the jurisdiction of the commune of Adja-Ouèrè. According to the population census conducted by the Institut National de la Statistique Benin on February 15, 2002, the arrondissement had a total population of 11,802.

References

Populated places in the Plateau Department
Arrondissements of Benin